The Italian Paralympic Committee, founded in 1990 and a member of the International Paralympic Committee (IPC), is responsible for the development and management of paralympic sports in Italy.

Presidents
2005-reigning: Luca Pancalli

Federazione Italiana Sport Handicappati (FISHa)
1980-1990 Roberto Marson

Federazione Italiana Sport Disabili (FISD)
1990 - 1992: Roberto Marson
1992: Mario Pescante (CONI Commissary)
1992 - 2000: Antonio Vernole
2000 - 2005: Luca Pancalli

See also
Italian National Olympic Committee
Italy at the Paralympics

References

External links
  
 Home page at IPC web site

Italy
 
Disability organisations based in Italy